This article lists political parties in Wallis and Futuna.
Wallis and Futuna has a multi-party system with numerous political parties, in which no one party often has a chance of gaining power alone, and parties must work with each other to form coalition governments.

The parties

Some of the French political parties are active in Wallis and Futuna.

Voice of the Wallis and Futuna Peoples (La Voix des Peuples Wallisens et Futuniens) 
People's Union for Wallis and Futuna (Union Populaire pour Wallis et Futuna )
Sigave National Association (Sigave L'Association Nationale)

See also
 Politics of Wallis and Futuna
 List of political parties by country

Wallis and Futuna
 
Political parties
+Wallis and Futuna
Wallis and Futuna

Political parties